Kizylkuma is an extinct genus of prehistoric frog in the family Alytidae (=Discoglossidae). Its fossils have been found in the Bissekty Formation (Uzbekistan).

See also 
 Prehistoric amphibian
 List of prehistoric amphibians

References

Cretaceous amphibians of Asia
Painted frogs
Turonian life
Fossils of Uzbekistan
Bissekty Formation
Fossil taxa described in 1981